Jesús Castro Romero (born 19 January 1993, in Vejer de la Frontera, Cádiz) is a Spanish actor known for starring alongside Luis Tosar in a leading role in El Niño. He is considered to be one of the new sex symbols of the Spanish cinema.

Biography 
Jesús Castro was born on 19 January 1993 at Hospital Universitario Puerto Real. Before being an actor, he worked in a discotheque and in his father's café.

He was cast in his role in El Niño from among three thousand young men who auditioned. After appearing in El Niño, someone suggested that he audition for a spot on the cast of La isla mínima, by Alberto Rodriguez Librero where he played Quini.

In 2015, Jesús was cast in the TV Series Mar de plastico, as Lucas Morales, playing in 13 episodes. Then in 2017 Jesús starred in the TV series shot by Mediaset Secretos de Estado with Michelle Calvó and Myriam Gallego, released in 2018. 

In 2018 it was announced by Diagonal TV that Jesús Castro and Aitor Luna were the first to be cast in the TV series La Reina del Sur. In addition, Brigada Costa del Sol, which is about drugs and is filming in Málaga, stars among Hugo Silva, and Álvaro Cervantes.

Personal life 
He has been in a relationship with the model Anabel Hernández since 2015.

Filmography

References

External links 

 
 

1993 births
Living people
Spanish male film actors
21st-century Spanish male actors
Spanish male television actors
Male actors from Andalusia